Stibadocerina is a genus of crane fly in the family Cylindrotomidae.

Biology
The larvae of the genus Stibadocerina live on mosses. Adults are to be found in damp wooded habitats.

Distribution
Chile.

Species
S. chilensis Alexander, 1929

References

Cylindrotomidae
Diptera of South America
Endemic fauna of Chile